A cordillera is an extensive chain and/or network system of mountain ranges, such as those in the west coast of the Americas.

The term is most commonly used in physical geography and is particularly applied to the various large mountain systems of the American Cordillera, such as the Andes of South America, and less frequently to other mountain ranges in the "ridge" that rims the Pacific Ocean. In Colombia and Venezuela, cordilleras are named according to their position: Cordillera Occidental, Central, and Oriental. Various local names are used for the cordilleras in Ecuador, Peru, Bolivia, Chile and Argentina.

Such mountain systems have a complex structure, which is usually the result of folding and faulting accompanied by volcanic activity. In South America, the ranges include numerous volcanic peaks. Some of the volcanoes have been active in historical times.

Aside from the volcanic peaks, the cordilleran crests include many narrow ridges, some of which reach into the zone of permanent snow. Between the ranges are numerous inhabited valleys, basins and low plateaus, with a wide range of elevations.

Notable cordilleras

 Alborz Cordillera, northern Iran (also written as Elburz)
 American Cordillera, the mountain ranges forming the western backbone of North America and South America
 North American Cordillera (also called Pacific Cordillera or Western Cordillera of North America), comprising the mountain ranges of western North America
 Cordillera Central, Costa Rica
 Cordillera Central, Dominican Republic on the island of Hispaniola
 Cordillera Central, Puerto Rico
 Cordillera Neovolcánica, an active volcanic belt in Mexico
 Mexican Cordillera, consisting of the Juarez Segment, the Huayacocotla Segment, the Victoria Segment, and the Nuevoleones Cordillera
 Cordillera de los Andes (also called the Andes Mountains or South American Cordillera), comprising the mountain ranges of western South America
 Cordillera Blanca, in Peru
 Cordillera de Mérida, in Venezuela
 Cordillera Central, Andes (Spanish: "central mountains"), several mountain ranges share the name, such as the one in Bolivia, Colombia, Ecuador and Peru
 Cordillera Occidental ("western mountains"), several mountain ranges share the name, such as the one in Bolivia, Colombia, Ecuador and Peru
 Cordillera Oriental ("eastern mountains"), several mountain ranges share the name, such as the one in Bolivia, Colombia, Ecuador and Peru
 Cordillera de la Costa ("coastal mountains") of Chile
 Cordillera Paine, in Torres del Paine National Park in Chilean Patagonia
 Cordillera de la Costa of Venezuela
 Annamese Cordillera (Annamite Range), in Laos and Vietnam
 Arctic Cordillera, the mountain ranges along the northeastern edge of the Arctic Archipelago and the northeasternmost part of the Labrador Peninsula in Labrador and Quebec, Canada
 Central Cordillera of New Guinea
 Cordillera Administrative Region (CAR), encompassing the Cordillera Central of Luzon and Southern Pacific Cordillera of Mindanao in the Philippines
 Cordilleras Béticas, Central and Cantábrica (including the Picos de Europa) in Spain
 East Australian Cordillera, more commonly known as the Great Dividing Range, the most significant topographic feature of the east coast of Australia
 High-Mountain Asia, mountain ranges surrounding the Tibetan Plateau, including the Himalayas, Hindu Kush, Kunlun Mountains, Tian Shan, Karakoram, Pamir-Alay and Hengduan Mountains

References

Mountains